Francis J. Lallensack (1916–1999) was a member of the Wisconsin State Assembly.

Biography
Lallensack was born on January 16, 1916, in Manitowoc, Wisconsin. He would become a police officer. During World War II, he served in the United States Army. Lallensack died on December 5, 1999.

Political career
Lallensack was a member of the Assembly from 1973 to 1981. He was a Democrat.

References

People from Manitowoc, Wisconsin
Democratic Party members of the Wisconsin State Assembly
Military personnel from Wisconsin
United States Army soldiers
United States Army personnel of World War II
American police officers
1916 births
1999 deaths
20th-century American politicians